
Gmina Liw is a rural gmina (administrative district) in Węgrów County, Masovian Voivodeship, in east-central Poland. It takes its name from the village of Liw (the site of a castle; formerly a town). The administrative seat of the gmina is the town of Węgrów, although the town is not part of the territory of the gmina.

Villages
Gmina Liw contains the villages and settlements of Borzychy, Janowo, Jarnice, Jarnice-Pieńki, Jartypory, Krypy, Kucyk, Liw, Ludwinów, Ossolin, Pierzchały, Połazie, Popielów, Ruchenka, Ruchna, Śnice, Starawieś, Szaruty, Tończa, Tończa-Janówki, Witanki, Wyszków, Zając and Zawady.

Neighbouring gminas
Gmina Liw is bordered by the town of Węgrów and by the gminas of Bielany, Grębków, Korytnica, Miedzna, Mokobody, Sokołów Podlaski, Stoczek and Wierzbno.

References

Polish official population figures 2006

Liw
Węgrów County